Buckskin Joe, also called Laurette or Lauret, is a deserted ghost town in Park County, Colorado, United States. It was an early mining town, and the former county seat of Park County.

History

The area was first inhabited by Non-Native Americans in 1859 during the Pikes Peak Gold Rush, when gold was discovered along Buckskin Creek, on the east side of the Mosquito Range.  At the time of its first settlement, the town was in the western part of Kansas Territory.

The town was formally organized in September 1860 and named Laurette, a contraction of the first names of the only two women in the camp, the sisters Laura and Jeanette Dodge. But it was always more popularly known as Buckskin Joe, after Joseph Higginbottom, an early trapper and prospector.  Little is known for certain about Higginbottom.  Some accounts refer to him as an African-American; some accounts say that he was the one who first discovered gold in the vicinity of the town.

Mining shifted to rich hardrock deposits in the Phillips lode and other veins.  By 1861, when the Laurette/Buckskin Joe Post Office opened, in the newly formed Colorado Territory, the town boasted two hotels, fourteen stores, and a bank.  On January 7, 1862 the county seat of Park County moved to Buckskin Joe from Tarryall, now also a ghost town.  At its peak, the town was credited with a population of 5,000, but historian Robert L. Brown considers this number far too large.

The placer and vein gold deposits were rich, but were quickly exhausted. By 1866, the town was reported to be deserted, and the courthouse building was moved down the valley to the new county seat of Fairplay. It remained there until 2011 when it, along with the entire tourist attraction and movie set, was sold to a private collector and moved to a private ranch in western Colorado.

Notable residents
John Lewis Dyer, Methodist circuit rider missionary, also arrived in Bucksin Joe in 1861, having migrated from Minnesota.
Frank H. Mayer, former U.S. marshal in Buckskin Joe, former buffalo hunter
Silverheels (proper name unknown) was a popular dance hall girl at Buckskin Joe and the subject of many apocryphal stories. Mount Silverheels is named in her honor. 
Horace Tabor, later a mining millionaire and U.S. senator, arrived in Buckskin Joe in 1861 and ran a store with his first wife.

Location

See also

 List of ghost towns in Colorado

References

External links

 Legends of America:  Buckskin Joe - Gone & Back Again
 Ghost Town Gallery:  Buckskin Joe, CO
 Ghost Towns.Com:  Buckskin Joe or Laurette

Ghost towns in Colorado
Former populated places in Park County, Colorado
1859 establishments in Kansas Territory